Nerodia floridana, commonly known as the Florida green watersnake, or eastern green watersnake,  is a harmless North American species of water snakes in the family Colubridae.

Description
N. floridana is the largest watersnake in North America. Fully grown it will typically reach  in total length (including tail), with the record-sized specimen having measured  in total length. Its coloration is solid grey or greenish-brownish with a white or yellow belly in adults, which darkens in color under the tail. Encircling the lower half of the eye is a row of scales, which is separate from the upper lip scales. Among all southeastern (U.S.) snakes, only the western green water snake has these features. Juveniles have typically, about 50 dark crossbars down the dorsum and on the sides, which fade gradually with age.

Distribution and habitat
N. floridana 's distribution is generally throughout Florida and in parts of southern Georgia. It is commonly found in southern South Carolina in open, marshy wetland areas. The snake is rarely found in  rivers or streams. N. floridana prefers choked vegetation and calm waters such as swamps and marshes. It is also generally found in lakes, ponds, ditches, and occasionally in brackish water.

Behaviour and ecology
In southern Florida, N. floridana is active year round.  Like other water snakes of the southeastern U.S., N. floridana hibernates during the winter in the northern, coldest parts of its range. In colder areas and months, the snake can be seen basking outdoors on sunny days. In southern Florida, it often travels overland  on rainy days.

Diet
Little is known about the diet of the N. floridana. Most reports suggest that their diet consists primarily of fish, including sunfish, crappies, and small bass. They also feed on frogs, especially pig frogs, tadpoles and salamander. Little is known about their methods for finding prey, but like other water snakes, the N. floridana swallows its prey alive.

Reproduction
This species bears live young (ovoviviparous) similar to other North American water snakes. A few observations have been made of matings in late winter or early spring. Females generally have very large litters and give birth in the summer. The size of the litter ranges from 20 to 40, and the young are typically born from June to September. The record litter for the species was 132 babies, taken from a dead female.

Threats
Because of the huge litters of the N. floridana, most juveniles never reach adulthood. Common predators in its wetland habitat include river otters, hawks, herons, egrets, ospreys, turtles, kingsnakes, alligators, and several varieties of predatory fish. The snake's first impulse when threatened is to escape, and will then resort to biting or releasing a strong musk from its scent glands, if captured.

Conservation status
The species is abundant in many wetland areas, except for the northern areas of its range. Thousands of N. floridana'''s die annually on Florida roads and highways near wetland habitats. In Georgia and South Carolina N. floridana is considered "state imperiled".

References

Further reading
Conant R, Bridges W (1939). What Snake Is That? A Field Guide to the Snakes of the United States East of the Rocky Mountains. (With 108 drawings by Edmond Malnate). New York and London: D. Appleton-Century. Frontispiece map + viii + 163  pp. + Plates A-C, 1-32. (Natrix cyclopion floridana, pp. 91–92 + Plate 15, figure 43).
Schmidt KP, Davis DD (1941). Field Book of Snakes of the United States and Canada. New York: G.P. Putnam's Sons. 365 pp. (Natrix cyclopion floridana, pp. 216–217).
Wright AH, Wright AA (1957). Handbook of Snakes of the United States and Canada. Ithaca and London: Comstock Publishing Associates, a division of Cornell University Press. 1,105 pp. (in 2 volumes). (Natrix cyclopion floridana'', pp. 474–477, Figure 140 + Map 38 on p. 467).

floridana
Snakes of North America
Reptiles of the United States
Endemic fauna of the United States
Fauna of the Southeastern United States
Reptiles described in 1936